BBWC may refer to:
 Battery-backed write cache, a technique for accelerating disk writes
 Beveled-base wadcutter, a type of bullets
 Brixton Black Women's Centre